The Lower Tamarack River is a  river in Pine County near the eastern border of Minnesota, in the United States. It is a tributary of the St. Croix River, which flows southwards to the Mississippi River.

The Upper Tamarack River is a separate stream also flowing into the St. Croix River several miles upstream from the mouth of the Lower Tamarack River.

See also
List of rivers of Minnesota
List of longest streams of Minnesota
Tamarack River (disambiguation)

References

Minnesota Watersheds
USGS Hydrologic Unit Map - State of Minnesota (1974)

Rivers of Minnesota
Tributaries of the St. Croix River (Wisconsin–Minnesota)
Rivers of Pine County, Minnesota